Carlo Glasbergen (born 16 May 1990 in Benthuizen) is a Dutch curler from Zoetermeer. During his career, he has played in ten European Curling Championships and five World Men's Curling Championships. He was the longtime lead on Team Jaap van Dorp.

Glasbergen won the Collie Campbell Memorial Award at the 2017 World Men's Curling Championship.

Personal life
In 2017, Glasbergen worked as a data analyst for Vitality Management.

Teammates

References

External links

Dutch male curlers
Living people
1990 births
People from Zoetermeer
Sportspeople from Alphen aan den Rijn